Antonia Jane Bird, FRSA (27 May  1951 – 24 October 2013) was an English producer and director of television drama and feature films.

Career
In 1968, at the age of 17, Bird began working in theatre as an assistant stage manager at Coventry Rep. She worked her way up doing a variety of jobs, including acting, stage management, publicity, theatre administration and directing in repertory and regional theatres. She directed a season of plays at The Studio at Chester Theatre and later joined Leicester's Phoenix Theatre as a director.

Bird was named resident director at the Royal Court Theatre in 1978. She was appointed artistic director of the Royal Court's Theatre Upstairs, London's leading venue for new writing. Her first television production was Submariners (1983), an adaptation of one of her Royal Court productions which she directed for the BBC. She was recruited by the originators and founding producers of EastEnders, Julia Smith and Tony Holland, to direct the series in 1985; she directed 17 episodes, including the series' first two-hander, between the characters Den Watts (Leslie Grantham) and Angie Watts (Anita Dobson).

The creators of Casualty (1986) recruited her to be one of the series' first directors. She next directed the six-part adaptation of Ann Oakley's The Men's Room (BBC 1991). Her next production was a feature-length film adaptation of A Masculine Ending (1992). Subsequently, Safe (BBC 1993), a story based on the lives of a group of homeless young people in London's West End was awarded the Best Single Drama TV BAFTA. The film also won a British Academy Award and a clutch of festival prizes including the Edinburgh International Film Festival First Film Award and Best British Film at the Dinard Film Festival. The film brought Bird to international attention, but was overshadowed by the success of Priest (BBC/Miramax 1994), which she directed immediately following Safe.

Bird's film Care, broadcast in 2000, dealt with sexual abuse in a children's home, and won the Best Single Drama TV BAFTA. She received a BAFTA Children's Award for the 2009 BBC documentary Off By Heart, about a national poetry competition for schoolchildren.

Bird developed feature films with Sony, Columbia, Warner Brothers, Fine Line and some American independent companies. She returned to London  to shoot Face (UIP/New Line 1997), a gangster film. She was back in the U.S. to develop the horror satire Ravenous, with Guy Pearce, Robert Carlyle and David Arquette (20th Century Fox 1999).

In 2005, she produced Faith, a 4Way Pictures/Company Pictures production about the 1984–1985 national miners' strike. She was an executive producer of the 2009 Iraqi film Son of Babylon.

In 2010, she and Kay Mellor realised their story about Mellor's mother in A Passionate Woman (BBC 2010), which the duo directed.

In 2011, Cross My Mind, Bird's next film, was set to start shooting.

In 2012, Bird directed the first four episodes of the first series of Peter Moffat's BBC period drama, The Village. Series 2 episode 1 finishes with the tribute 'For Antonia Bird 1951–2013'.

Affiliations
Bird was a member of the American Academy of Motion Picture Arts and Sciences; the British Academy of Film and Television Arts, the Directors Guild of America, Directors UK, BECTU, and a Fellow of the Royal Society of Arts.

Death
Bird died from a rare anaplastic thyroid cancer on 24 October 2013 at the age of 62. She is survived by her husband, the TV editor Ian Ilet.

Filmography

Television

Film

See also
 List of female film and television directors
 List of LGBT-related films directed by women

References

External links

Additional sources
 Ciecko, Anne T. "Sex, God, Television, Realism, and the British Women Filmmakers Beeban Kidron and Antonia Bird", Journal of Film and Video, Spring 1999, pp. 22–41 
 McCabe, Bob. "East End Heat", Sight and Sound, October 1997, pp. 10–12 

1951 births
2013 deaths
BAFTA winners (people)
Deaths from cancer in England
Deaths from thyroid cancer
English film directors
English television directors
English theatre directors
People from Kensington
English women film directors
British women television directors